Alucita acutata is a moth of the family Alucitidae. It is found in mainland Italy and on Sicily and Sardinia.

References

Moths described in 1994
Alucitidae
Endemic fauna of Italy
Moths of Europe